This is a list of high-rise buildings in Leipzig that stand at least  tall, without superstructures. Only habitable buildings and a book magazine are ranked, which excludes radio masts and towers, observation towers, steeples, chimneys and other tall architectural structures. With the Kroch high-rise of 1928 and the Europahaus of 1930 at the Augustusplatz, Leipzig was one of the first high-rise cities in Germany.

List

High-rise buildings in Leipzig being planned or under construction  
Due to the constant strong growth of the number of inhabitants of Leipzig, after many years of stagnation and demolition, the focus is again on the construction of high-rise buildings. Among other things, 3,700 apartments as well as commercial and office space are to be built. In addition to two 10-storey high points at the edges, there will be a city park in the middle, which will be framed by three 16-storey high-rise buildings

In 2022 it became known that a residential complex, the Mockauer Tor, was to be built in the area of the Berlin Bridge located north of Leipzig Central Station on the border of the three boroughs Mitte, Nord (North) and Nordost (Northeast).

For a limited time, the Bundesland of Saxony is funding high-rise timber building projects under the keyword "experimental construction". In this context, Saxony's first wooden high-rise is to be built in Leipzig-Paunsdorf on Heiterblickallee. The owner is the housing cooperative Wohnungsbaugenossenschaft Kontakt.

The high-rise development on the Goerdelerring, on the other hand, will take some time to come. The city of Leipzig has set itself the goal of determining the course of the opening of the underground waterway named Pleißemühlegraben in this area. Only then will it be clear whether the high-rise will be built next to or above the uncovered waterway, which will have a significant impact on the planning and architecture of the building.

See also 
 List of tallest buildings in Germany

Literature 
 
 
 
 Reuther, I. (2000). Prototyp und Sonderfall Über Hochhäuser in Leipzig. In: Rodenstein, M. (eds) Hochhäuser in Deutschland. Vieweg+Teubner Verlag, Wiesbaden. https://doi.org/10.1007/978-3-322-99951-1_9

References 

Buildings and structures in Leipzig
 Leipzig